Harmandiola castaneae is a species of gall midge, insects in the family Cecidomyiidae. This species induces leaf galls on Castanea dentata. It was first described by Fannie Adelle Stebbins in 1910.

References

Cecidomyiinae
Insects described in 1910

Gall-inducing insects
Diptera of North America
Taxa named by Fannie A. Stebbins